Klukowa Huta  (Kashubian Klëkòwô Hëta) is a village in the administrative district of Gmina Stężyca, within Kartuzy County, Pomeranian Voivodeship, in northern Poland.

For details of the history of the region, see History of Pomerania.

The village has a population of 561.

References

Klukowa Huta